Ulrich Joseph Franzen (January 15, 1921 – October 6, 2012) was a German-born American architect known for his "fortresslike" buildings and Brutalist style.

Franzen was born in Düsseldorf, Germany, the son of Eric and Lisbeth Hellersberg Franzen.  They emigrated to the United States in 1936.  He lived with his mother and a younger brother once his parents divorced.  He obtained an undergraduate degree from Williams College, and after one semester at the architectural school at Harvard University, joined the Army.  After World War II ended, he obtained a master's degree from Harvard in 1950.  By 1951, he was working for I. M. Pei.  He left Pei and formed his own firm, Ulrich Franzen & Associates, in 1955.

The Alley Theatre in Houston, Texas, which was completed in 1968, was Franzen's first prominent solo project.  Franzen also designed the headquarters for the Miller Brewing Company in Milwaukee, WI (completed 1976).  In 2005, LA DALLMAN was commissioned to create the new Miller Corporate Pub and Meeting Center, fully renovating the ground floor. The project received a 2005 American Institute of Architects Wisconsin Honor Award. His other notable projects include the East and West towers at Hunter College (completed in 1984 after a long delay due to the financial crisis in New York City), and the Philip Morris headquarters in New York City (completed in 1982).

Franzen died on October 6, 2012, in Santa Fe, New Mexico, survived by his wife Josephine.  He was 91.

Notable works

 1956: Franzen House, Rye, New York
 1957: Towers House, Essex, Connecticut
 1958: Beattie House, Rye, New York
 1959: Weissman House, Rye, New York
1961: Miller/Efinger House ("Prism in the Pines"), Brewster, New York
 1963: Bernstein House, Great Neck, New York
 1963: Dana House, New Canaan, Connecticut
 1963: Whiting Dress Factory, Pleasantville, New York
 1964: Castle House, New London, Connecticut
 1965: Buttenweiser House, Mamaroneck, New York
 1966: The Folly at Field Farm, Williamstown, Massachusetts
 1968-1970: Paraphernalia Store, Lexington Avenue, New York City, New York
 1968: Bradfield Hall (agronomy building), Ithaca, New York
 1968: Emerson Hall, Cornell University, Ithaca, New York
 1968: Alley Theatre, Houston, Texas
 1969: “The Street” Urban Concept
 1969-1972: University of New Hampshire, Durham, New Hampshire
 1969-1972: Harpers Ferry Center, West Virginia
 1969: The Cooper Union, New York City, New York (Entwurf)
 1970: First Unitarian Church, Richmond, Virginia
 1974-1975: Franzen Penthouse, New York City, New York
 1974-1978: The Harlem School of the Arts, New York City, New York
 1974: First City National Bank, Binghamton, New York
 1974: Multi-Cat Research Tower (Veterinary School) at Cornell University, Ithaca, New York
 1974: The Evolving City 
 1975-1984: Hunter College, New York City, New York
 1978-1979: Franzen House, Bridgehampton, New York
 1978: Krauss House, Old Westbury, New York
 1980-1981: University Center at University of Michigan, Flint, Michigan
 1980-1982: Miller Brewing Visitors Centers
 1981: Boyce Thompson Institute for Plant Research, Ithaca, New York
 1983: Champion International, Stamford, Connecticut
 1984: Philip Morris Headquarters, New York City
 1985: Glimcher House, Long Island, New York
 1994: Morris House, Greenwich, Connecticut

References

Further reading
Blake, Peter. The Architecture of Ulrich Franzen: Selected Works (Birkhäuser Basel 1999)

External links
The Architecture of Ulrich Franzen:  An Inventory, Special Collections, Frances Loeb Library, Graduate School of Design, Harvard University.

20th-century American architects
1921 births
2012 deaths
Brutalist architects
Modernist architects
Harvard Graduate School of Design alumni
Williams College alumni
German emigrants to the United States